Italian Benghazi (called "Bengasi italiana" in Italian language) was the name used during the Italian colonization of Libya for the port-city of Benghazi in Italian Cyrenaica.

History

On October 19, 1911 the Ottoman city of Benghazi was occupied by the Italians during the Italo-Turkish War. 

Even if Benghazi city accepted the Italians and some members (mainly Jews) of the local community collaborated with the Italian government, in the interior nearly half the local population of Cyrenaica under the leadership of Omar Mukhtar resisted the Italian occupation. Many local arabs -under the Senussi leadership- suffered oppression, particularly from the fascist dictator Mussolini in the late 1920s.

In the early 1930s, the revolt was over and the Italians—under governor Italo Balbo—started attempts to assimilate the local population with pacifying policies: a number of new villages for local Cyrenaicans were created with health services and schools.

Additionally Cyrenaica was populated by more than 20,000 Italian colonists in the late 1930s, mainly around the coast of Benghazi. Benghazi population was made up of more than 35 per cent of Italians in 1939.
In 1941 Italian Benghazi -according to estimates of the Italian government- reached a temporary population of nearly 80,000 inhabitants, due to the arrival of many Italians from Cyrenaica who took refuge from the British army attacks during WWII. As a consequence Benghazi was in that year -for the first time since the Arab conquest in 643 AD- a city mostly Christian.

Population of the main urban centers of Italian Libya, according to the Census of 1939/40:

"Bengasi italiana" was conquered by the British Army in February 1941, but after only 2 months (when Australian troops harassed the civilian population) the Italians reconquered the city with the help of Rommel's Afrika Korps. The British definitively occupied the city after the Battle of El Alamein. Benghazi was heavily bombed during World War II (more than one thousand times) and -when the British finally occupied the  city in December 1942- nearly 85% of the city was damaged or destroyed.

Benghazi was then governed by the British until independence in 1951. Under the terms of the 1947 peace treaty with the Allies, Italy relinquished all claims to Libya.

After WWII the era of international decolonization fostered an exodus of Italians from Benghazi, especially after Libya became independent in 1953. After 1970 the Italian population of the city -reduced to a few hundred inhabitants- practically disappeared when Libyan president Muammar Gaddafi ordered the expulsion of all Italians from his Libya. At present, the Libyan Italians (and the few "Bengasini" still living) are organized in the Associazione Italiani Rimpatriati dalla Libia.

Characteristics

Italian Benghazi was located in northern Italian Libya, in Cyrenaica. It was the administrative center of the Italian Benghazi Province, on the Mediterranean coast.

In 1911 Ottoman Benghazi had less than 5,000 inhabitants, and nearly one half of them were Jews, who welcomed the Italians. Indeed the Italians conquered from the Ottomans in 1911 a region in coastal Cyrenaica that was very poor and underdeveloped: it had no asphalted road, no telegraph services, no sewages system and no hospitals (in 1874 Benghazi had been depopulated by the bubonic plague).  In the next twenty years they built all these infrastructures and by the early 1930s a new port and a railways station were created in Benghazi.

In the 1920s in the Benghazi province was created a railway between Benghazi and Barce: a 750 mm (2 ft 5 1⁄2 in) (later 950 mm) gauge railway was built east from Benghazi; the main route was 110 km long to Marj and was opened in stages between 1911 and 1927. Benghazi also had a 56 km branch to Suluq opened in 1926.

In the late 1920s was created the Benghazi airport (now called Benina International Airport) and was greatly enlarged the Port of Benghazi. Inside the greater Port in the 1930s was created a modern "Idroscalo" (seaplane station) for the flights between "Bengasi italiana" and Italy. The Benghazi airport was connected to Italy and other Libyan airports, but the main flight was the worldwide famous Linea dell'Impero. This line of Ala Littoria was considered the most prestigious line of early Italian civil aviation era: it was opened after the Italian conquest of Ethiopia in 1936 and was followed by the first air links with the Italian colonies in Italian East Africa, which began in a pioneering way since 1934. The route was enlarged to 6,379 km and initially joined Rome with Addis Ababa via Syracuse, Benghazi, Cairo, Wadi Halfa, Khartoum, Kassala, Asmara, Dire Dawa. 

There was a change of aircraft in Benghazi and the passengers could relax and stay in the modern "Albergo Berenice".

In the coast of the province was built in 1937-1938 a section of the Via Balbia, a road that went from Italian Tripoli and Tunisia's frontier to the border of Egypt. The car tag for the Italian province of Benghazi was "BE".

In the late 1930s in the Benghazi province were settled thousands of Italians as farmers in special villages. Most of the Italians were concentrated in the city of Benghazi, where they were in 1939 nearly one third of the population. Those Italians brought to the city the Italian passion for soccer and sports: in the late 1930s was created the "Stadio Municipale", one of the first stadiums in Libya.

Benghazi came under Italian rule in the early part of the 20th century: some examples of Italianate, as well as modernist colonial architecture from this period remain today. Under the governorships of Generals Ernesto Mombelli and Attilio Teruzzi in the 1920s, the buildings commissioned in Benghazi had an eclectic architectural language that embodied a Western conception of Eastern architecture. An example of this is the Municipal palace built in 1924, which stands in Maydan al-Hurriya (Freedom Square). The building combines Moorish arches with Italianate motifs on the facade. Italians even did the first architectural plan of Benghazi in the 1930s, with a new railway station and large promenade.

Urban Plan & infrastructures

The first Italian infrastructures in Benghazi dated at the time of the conquest, in late 1911, when was done the enlargement of the small Ottoman port that was greatly improved and when was created the communication network with the interior through the construction of two railway lines. Between 1922 and the early thirties the Italian government was organizing an Italian-populated center in the area that overlooked the harbour, encircling the Arab city, as it happened in the initial period with the Military barracks "Generale Torelli", the Military "Autogruppo" and other equipments & infrastructures of this type. 

The heart of the Italian city was constituted by the "King's Square", former Ottoman Salt Square that was called in Italian "Piazza del Re", with the central part arranged as a garden park. On it overlooked the Palace Government, a Moorish-style building, later the seat of the "Parliament of Cyrenaica", which housed the Library and the Civil Court, and other remarkable architectural buildings.

In the square there was the "Corso Italia", lined with palm trees, the main artery of the city leading to the new "Benghazi Train Station"; on it stood the main facade of the Governor's Palace (built in 1928-34), designed by the famous architects Alpago Novello, Cabiati and Ferrazza, overlooking "Piazza XXVIII October".  Here were lined up various buildings such as the Elementary and Middle School and the Sports Club. King's Square was connected by the axis of "Via Roma" and "Via Generale Briccola", the Town Hall Square, located within the ancient city, in which stood the Town Hall built in the Moorish style.

The Benghazi Municipal Hall was built in 1924 and was considered one of the best colonial buildings in Africa. While the facades were designed by the architect Ivo Lebboroni, the interior frescoes are the work of Guido Cadorin, and the chandeliers are by Umberto Bellotto. The furniture inside the town hall was designed by the company Ducrot. The portico of the facade and the interiors were designed by Roman architect Marcello Piacentini: the style of his buildings is characteristic of the Neo-Moorish period of Italian colonial architecture in Libya in the 1920s. This is evident in his "Albergo Italia" as well as the "Berenice Theatre" in central Benghazi. Piacentini was later made project manager of all Italian building works in Cyrenaica.

In 1928 the Milan Studio of architecture owned by Alpago Novello, Cabiati and Ferrazza, got the task of studying a "Plan of Benghazi", where they had already designed the Cathedral (built in 1928-34), located in the Square "Martiri Fascisti" (Fascist Martyrs).

Furthermore in the 1930s many architects came from Italy to work and create the new "Bengasi italiana": Limongelli, Alpago Novello, Cabiati, Ferrazza, Di Fausto, Rava, Piccinato, Pellegrini, Gennari and Di Segni were the most famous

The new Benghazi therefore was developed between the old city and the suburb of Berca through the isthmus situated between the "Punta Saline" in the West, where arose the "Industrial basin and Docking area", and the saline Ain es-Selmani eastward. The main axis on which the Plan was based were the "Via Scerif" and the street parallel, obtained by the extension of "Corso Italia". The goal was to merge in an organic unity the distinct areas of the city incorporating the existing structures: although the trend, at least for the old section, was always that of separation from the Italian-populated city, as demonstrated with the enlargement of Aghib street and the expansion planned for the axis of Via Roma and Via Generale Briccola, where in some buildings were built huge arcades (as in northern Italy).

The largest colonial building from this Italian period is the Benghazi Cathedral in "Maydan El Catedraeya" (Cathedral Square), which was inaugurated in 1934 and has two large distinct domes.
The Cathedral -an example of neo-classical architecture- was designed with an entrance that has a portico with six Doric columns, by the Italian famous architects Guido Ottavo and Ottavio Cabiati. 

Cabiati also created the "Palazzo del Governatore" (later called "Al Manar Palace" and campus site of the University of Libya) and the large "Lungomare" (promenade).

Gallery

Notes

Bibliography

 Antonicelli, Franco. Trent'anni di storia italiana 1915-1945. Mondadori. Torino, 1961.
 Bertarelli, Luigi Vittorio. Guida d'Italia: Possedimenti e colonie. Touring Club Italiano. Milano, 1929
 Bollati, Ambrogio. Enciclopedia dei nostri combattimenti coloniali, Einaudi. Torino, 1936
 Calace, Francesca. «Restituiamo la Storia» – dagli archivi ai territori. Architetture e modelli urbani nel Mediterraneo orientale. Gangemi, Roma, 2012 
 Capresi, Vittoria. I centri rurali libici. L´architettura dei centri rurali di fondazione costruiti in Libia – colonia italiana – durante il fascismo (1934-1940). Vienna University of Technology. Vienna, 2007
 Chapin Metz, Helen. Libya: A Country Study. Washington: GPO for the Library of Congress, 1987
 Guida d'Italia del TCI. Possedimenti e colonie  Edizioni Touring Club. Milano, 1929
 Pagano, Giovanni. Architettura e città durante il fascismo. Editori Laterza. Roma, 1990 
 Santoianni, Vittorio. Il Razionalismo nelle colonie italiane 1928-1943.La «nuova architettura» delle Terre d’Oltremare. Ed. Universita' Federico II. Napoli, 2008

See also

 Italian Tripoli
 Italian Libya 
 Benghazi
 Provincia di Bengazi
 Port of Benghazi
 Linea dell'Impero
 Italian Cyrenaica
 Bengasi (film)

External links
 Photos and writings of an Italian of Bengasi
 Benghazi 1933: Video showing King of Italy's visit
 Benghazi 1942: Video from movie "Bengasi", presented at the Venice Film Festival

Italian Libya
Italian colonisation in Africa
Benghazi